The Christians is a 1987 Soviet drama film directed by .

Plot 
The film is about a woman named Pelageya Karaulova who refuses to take the oath before the cross, explaining that she is not a Christian.

Cast 
 Lyubov Polishchuk
 Lev Zolotukhin
 Nikolai Pastukhov
 Leonid Monastyrsky
 Vladimir Ivashov
 Svetlana Orlova
 Sergey Taramaev
 Svetlana Ryabova	
 Vladimir Sergachyov	
 Anatoliy Obukhov

References

External links 
 

1987 films
1980s Russian-language films
Soviet drama films
Films based on works by Leonid Andreyev
1987 drama films